The Utah Cowboy and Western Heritage Museum, located in Ogden, Utah, is a state-recognized museum which collects and presents artifacts of the American frontier. It is situated in Ogden Union Station, along with the Utah State Railroad Museum, John M. Browning Firearms Museum, Kimball Classic Car Museum, and Myra Powell Gallery. The Cowboy Museum contains the Utah Cowboy Hall of Fame, which is associated with the Ogden Pioneer Heritage Foundation.

The museum plans to expand to include a research center in the future.

The museum was established in 2012, with a grant from the state of Utah, to honor the cowboy, along with those men and women whose lives exemplify the independence, resilience and creativeness of the people who settled Utah and continue to champion the Western way of life.  This includes artists, champions, competitive performers, entertainers, musicians, ranchers, writers, and persons past and present who have promoted the Western lifestyle.

The museum was established under the auspices of the Ogden Pioneer Days Foundation, who asked Susan Van Hooser to chair the establishment of the museum.  She and her committee only had about six weeks to accomplish that goal.  It was only open for the month of July that first year, but by the following year the museum committee, with the help of a benefactor and the Foundation were able to find a location within the Union Station building, which is rapidly being outgrown.

The museum endeavors to collect Western artifacts that paint a historical picture of the diversity related to the establishment and development of our Western ethic, including those accessories that are peculiar to the American cowboy.

Although at present - June 22, 2018 - we do not have room for a library, we have collected quite a few books relating to Western history, arts and crafts, and reprints of old catalogues showing styles of spurs, saddles, hats and various western memorabilia.  We also have quite a few books dealing with the history, culture and crafts of the Native American.  In addition we have photographs, histories - oral and written - documenting Utah's Western culture and its people, including Native Americans.

It is hoped that in the not too distant future, these items will be available for research purposes.

Each year applicants for the Hall of Fame can be submitted.  A committee of individuals not connected to the museum are provided with a packet for individuals submitted.  Through an individual and private voting process, with up to three votes taken to narrow the field, the winners are determined.  The first part of July the inductions are carried out at Union Station.  Anyone interested can attend the induction ceremony free of charge.

Selected Hall of Fame inductees
A selected list of notable inductees to the Utah Cowboy Hall of Fame includes:
Gary Cooper  (1901-1961)
Grant Speed (1930-2011), cowboy artist - 2014
Earl W. Bascom (1906-1995), rodeo champion, cowboy artist and sculptor - 2013
Lewis Feild (1956-2016), rodeo champion - 2012

Hall of Fame Inductees
The Utah Cowboy and Western Heritage Museum recognizes those individuals who settled Utah. It also recognizes individuals from many disciplines who have or continue to promote the Western style of living.

2019

 Val Leavitt
 Raymond Moser
 Gerald Young
Source:

2018

 Gary Blackburn
 Jay Hadley
 Monty Hadley
 Brent Kelly
 Steven Money
 Joe and Carrie Ruiz

2017

 Darrell Christensen
 Lon Hansen
 Flip Harmon
 Vern Oyler
 Chuck Story

2016

 Marvin Dunbar
 Don Kennington
 Mary Shaw-Drake
 Norman “Shorty” Thompson
 Kenneth Woolstenhulme
 Cody Wright

2015

 Tanya McKinnon Bartlett
 Gary Cooper
 Bud Favero
 Jack Hannum
 Dean Steed
 Francisco Zamora

2014

 James W. Fain
 Ron & Ginger Brown
 Bar T Rodeo
 Dale Pendleton
 James “Jim” B. Smith
 U. Grant Speed

2013

 Archie Anderson 
 The Baldwins:  George Henry, Angus and George Earl 
 Glen Thompson 
 Earl W. Bascom
 Rose Flynt Bascom “Texas Rose” 
 Vicki Vest Woodward 

2012

 Cotton & Karin Rosser
 Connie Della Lucia Robinson
 Susan Merrill Agricola
 Lewis and Calvin Grant
 Kenneth “Ken” Cross
 Judy Butler Anderson
 Weber County Sheriff’s Posse
 J. G. Read
 Harman W. Peery
 Lewis Feild
 Lorene Donaldson Call
Source:

See also
 List of music museums

References

External links 
 

Cowboy halls of fame
Halls of fame in Utah
State halls of fame in the United States
Museums in Weber County, Utah
2012 establishments in Utah
Tourist attractions in Ogden, Utah
Awards established in 2012